Sanitka (Czech for Ambulance) is a Czech medical drama series, first broadcast in 1984. Eleven episodes were made. It stars Jaromír Hanzlík, Tomáš Juřička and Zlata Adamovská among others.

Storyline
The story follows a doctor who chooses to become a paramedic instead of advancing his current career in medicine from 1956 to 1975.

References

Czechoslovak television series
1984 Czechoslovak television series debuts
Czech drama television series
1980s Czechoslovak television series
1990s Czech television series
Czech medical television series
Czechoslovak Television original programming